TG Omori, also known as Boy Director (born ThankGod Omori Jesam) is a Nigerian music video director and cinematographer.
TG Omori has directed music videos for recording artists across various genres of new generation, includes Olamide, Wizkid, Burna Boy, Tekno, Kiss Daniel, Fireboy DML, Falz, Timaya, Naira Marley, Asake and many others.

Early life 

ThankGod Omori Jesam, hails from Cross-River State in Nigeria. Omori grew up in Agungi, Lagos State, Nigeria from a middle-class background. He started directing  at 15 while overseeing stage plays in his school and church. Omori was advised by his dad to be a waiter at a restaurant since nothing was going well  for him at that time. Omori started making videos at the early age of 16, but took it up professionally at 20 after  graduating from PEFTI Film Institute, making him the youngest professional filmmaker in Nigeria at the time. He always said that the camera is just a tool, not the main creator.

Career 

In 2019, TG Omori was responsible for around half of the videos on the summer 2019 charts Count down on MTV, Soundcity, and Trace. He directed videos for numerous musicians, including a controversial song by Naira Marley "Am I a Yahoo boy", "Totori" by Olamide & Wizkid, and "Soapy" by Naira Marley which won viewers Choice at the 2020 Soundcity MVP Awards Festival. In 2019, he won video director of the year at City People Entertainment Awards and directed two videos in top 10  most viewed Nigerian music videos of 2019.

In 2021, a video for the North African remix featuring  ElGrande Toto was released on 4 November 2021. It was shot in Lagos and was directed by TG Omori, it surpassed 34 million views after a month of release on YouTube.

Fashion 
TG Omori's, career, however, is not just limited to the behind the scene alone but has appeared also as a fashion model and has featured on the runway of the prominent Heineken Lagos fashion week.

He is known for his different style of fashion and is never ashamed to show off his lifestyle. Recently he has featured in front of the cameras of music videos.

Videography

Awards and nominations

See also 
 List of Nigerian cinematographers

References

External links 

TG Omori on Instagram
Official Website
Fan
page 
YouTube 

Living people
Nigerian film directors
Nigerian cinematographers
Nigerian music video directors
1995 births